Eugène Galien-Laloue (December 11, 1854 – 1941) was a French artist. He was a populariser of street scenes, usually painted in autumn or winter.

Biography

He was born in Paris of French-Italian parents. His paintings of the early 1900s accurately represent the era in which he lived: a happy, bustling Paris, la Belle Époque, with horse-drawn carriages, trolley cars and its first omnibuses. Galien-Laloue's works are valued not only for their contribution to 20th-century art, but for the actual history, which they document.  His work can be seen at the Musée des Beaux-Arts, Louvier; Musée des Beaux-Arts, La Rochelle; Mulhouse, France.
 
A typical Galien-Laloue painting depicts sidewalks and avenues crowded with people or tourists mingling before the capital's monuments. He also painted the landscapes of Normandy and Seine-et-Marne, as well as military scenes he was commissioned to produce in 1914. The Republic of France selected Galien-Laloue to work as a 'war artist,' both during the Franco-Prussian War and World War I, chiefly in watercolor.

Galien-Laloue was in exclusive contract with one gallery and used other names: "L.Dupuy", "Juliany", "E.Galiany", "Lievin", "G.L"  "Dumoutier" and "P.Mattig".

Gallery

See also
 Fin de siècle
 Gay Nineties
 Gilded Age
 Roaring Twenties

References

External links

1854 births
1941 deaths
19th-century French painters
French male painters
20th-century French painters
20th-century French male artists
French war artists
19th-century French male artists
Belle Époque